Márcio Vinícius Forte (born 23 April 1977), is a Brazilian born, Italian futsal player who plays for S.S. Lazio calcio a 5 and the Italian national futsal team.

References

External links
UEFA profile

1977 births
Living people
Sportspeople from Londrina
Italian men's futsal players
Brazilian emigrants to Italy